Winston Wilkinson may refer to:
 Winston Wilkinson (government official)
 Winston Wilkinson (badminton)